Spitalfield was an American rock band from Chicago, Illinois signed to Victory Records.
Formed in 1998, Spitalfield caught the attention of Victory Records with their 2002 release The Cloak And Dagger Club EP and a year later released their follow-up, Remember Right Now. The band sold over 130,000 records and performed in nine countries over three continents before disbanding at the end of 2007.

Spitalfield derived their band name from Spitalfields, a section of London's East End where Jack the Ripper operated. 
The band announced their breakup and subsequent goodbye tour on September 10, 2007.

Since the breakup, lead vocalist Mark Rose has pursued a solo singer/songwriter career.

The band played a secret show on October 6, 2012 at Santos Party House in New York City, under the name The Cloak & Dagger Club (the name of the band's first EP).

Discography

Albums
 Faster Crashes Harder (2001)
 Remember Right Now (2003)
 Stop Doing Bad Things (2005)
 Better than Knowing Where You Are (2006)

Collections
 Everything 1998-2002 (2007)

EPs
 Capture the Moment (1998)
 Don't Worry About It Loves Spitalfield (2000, 12" split record with Don't Worry About It)
 The Cloak & Dagger Club EP (2002)

Singles
"I Loved the Way She Said 'L.A.'" (2003)
"Those Days You Felt Alive" (2003)
"Gold Dust Vs. the State of Illinois" (2005)
"Secrets in Mirrors" (2006)

"Secrets in Mirrors" was pre-loaded in the Walkman NW-E013 model.

Non-album tracks
"It's Cold Out There" – released on A Santa Cause 2: It's a Punk Rock Christmas (2006)
"The Yearbook Song" - unreleased (2001)

Band members

Mark Rose - vocals, guitar 
J.D. Romero - drums 
 Daniel Lowder - guitar, backing vocals
 T. J. Minich - bass, vocals

References

External links
Facebook
MySpace
PureVolume

Musical groups disestablished in 2007
Musical groups established in 1998
Musical groups from Chicago
Pop punk groups from Illinois
Victory Records artists
American punk rock groups
Alternative rock groups from Illinois